Fatherhood is a 2021 American comedy-drama film directed by Paul Weitz from a screenplay by Weitz and Dana Stevens based on the 2011 memoir Two Kisses for Maddy: A Memoir of Loss and Love by Matthew Logelin. The film stars Kevin Hart, Alfre Woodard, Frankie R. Faison, Lil Rel Howery, DeWanda Wise, Anthony Carrigan, Melody Hurd, and Paul Reiser, and follows a new father who struggles to raise his daughter after the sudden death of his wife.

Originally scheduled to be released in theaters by Sony Pictures Releasing, Fatherhood was sold to Netflix during the COVID-19 pandemic and was digitally released on June 18, 2021. The film received mixed reviews from critics, with criticism for its formulaic approach but the emotional weight and Hart's against-type performance receiving praise.

Plot

Childhood sweethearts Matt and Liz Logelin prepare for the birth of their first child. Soon after delivering their daughter, Maddy, Liz suddenly suffers a pulmonary embolism and dies. 

Matt is devastated, but is determined to raise Maddy as a single parent. His friends and family, however, are concerned that he may not have the skills or patience to handle raising Maddy alone. Liz's mother, Marion, who has a tense relationship with Matt, is who feels this the most strongly. After he refuses to let her stay for six months to help care for Maddy or move back to his hometown of Minnesota, Marion warns him that Maddy needs family and female role models, and that he has to think about what is best for her. 

Though Matt initially struggles with the demands of Maddy's care while working full-time, grieving Liz, and suffering from sexism and insensitivity from others who do not respect his role in his daughter's life, he eventually succeeds with the help of friends and fellow parents.

Maddy grows into a confident and tomboyish young girl, while Matt is set up at a party with a mutual friend. Though he is unnerved that her name is Lizzie, they hit it off and begin dating. Though Maddy initially does not like the idea of her father dating, she quickly warms up to Lizzie, and they become friends. But when Maddy is injured on the playground and Matt does not hear the school's phone calls while sleeping with Lizzie, he fears that dating her is getting in the way of focusing on Maddy's needs. He breaks up with her, which upsets Maddy.

Matt and Maddy travel back to Minnesota for Marion's birthday. Maddy, beginning to feel the absence of a mother figure in her life more acutely, is overjoyed to be able to stay in her mother's old room and learn more about Liz. Matt, however, is unhappy seeing Liz's room changed, and insists that it is confusing for Maddy. When he tries to leave with her, she insists that she is happier here with family and reminders of her mother. Believing that he has repeatedly failed to understand Maddy's real needs, Matt reluctantly leaves her with her grandparents and returns home alone.

Despite success at work and an anticipated promotion, Matt misses Maddy and blames himself for being a bad father. When in the airport, preparing for a long business trip abroad, Matt is overwhelmed with sights of fatherhood and leaves to go back to Minnesota, where he reunites with Maddy and makes up with her. With Marion's blessing, they return home, where Matt rekindles his relationship with Lizzie.

Cast
 Kevin Hart as Matthew Logelin
 Melody Hurd as Maddy Logelin
 Alfre Woodard as Marion
 Lil Rel Howery as Jordan
 DeWanda Wise as Lizzie Swan
 Anthony Carrigan as Oscar
 Paul Reiser as Howard
 Deborah Ayorinde as Liz Logelin
 Teneisha Collins as Ms. Lillian Burns
 Frankie Faison as Mike

Production
In July 2012, it was reported that Marta Kauffman, Denise Di Novi and Allison Greenspan were developing a television film adaptation of Matthew Logelin's memoir Two Kisses for Maddy: A Memoir of Loss & Love for the Lifetime network. This version did not move forward, and in May 2015, it was announced that Two Kisses for Maddy would be a feature film, with Channing Tatum starring and producing, Dana Stevens writing the screenplay, and TriStar Pictures distributing. In January 2019, it was announced that the film would be titled Fatherhood and star Kevin Hart, replacing Tatum, with Paul Weitz directing and writing his own draft. In May 2019, Melody Hurd and Alfre Woodard were set to star opposite Hart. In June 2019, Anthony Carrigan, Lil Rel Howery, Paul Reiser and Deborah Ayorinde also joined the cast of the film, which had been moved to Columbia Pictures. In July 2019, DeWanda Wise was also added.

Release
Fatherhood was initially scheduled to be released in theaters on April 3, 2020, but on January 6, 2020, it was delayed to January 8, 2021. Later that year, it was pushed back a week to January 15, 2021. On March 30, 2020, it was brought forward to October 23, 2020 due to the COVID-19 pandemic. On April 24, 2020, it was delayed to April 2, 2021, and on November 19, 2020, it was delayed again to April 16, 2021.

It was then announced that Netflix had acquired the worldwide distribution rights (except China) to the film from Sony Pictures Releasing, and set it for streaming release on June 18, 2021. The film was the most-watched item on the service in its first weekend. A week after its release, Netflix reported the film was on track to by watched by 61 million households through its first month of release.

Home media
Fatherhood was released on Blu-ray, DVD, and Digital HD on June 14, 2022 by Sony Pictures Home Entertainment.

Reception 
On the review aggregator website Rotten Tomatoes, the film holds an approval rating of 66% based on 70 reviews, with an average rating of 6.7/10. The site's critics consensus reads, "Fatherhood offers few surprises, but strong work from a smartly assembled cast gives this fact-based story real emotional resonance." According to Metacritic, which assigned a weighted average score of 53 out of 100 based on 18 critics, the film received "mixed or average reviews".

William Bibbiani of the TheWrap praised Hart's "confidently laid-back and affable lead performance," and wrote, "Perhaps a little too slight to be memorable in the long run, this sensitive and charming tale reassures without, somehow, completely ignoring reality." From The Hollywood Reporter, Lovia Gyarkye called the film "both an effective star vehicle and a tender tearjerker," and said, "Hart, usually known for his comedy... embraces a more dramatic side here, and is surprisingly convincing in these moments."

References

External links
 

2021 comedy-drama films
2020s English-language films
African-American comedy-drama films
African-American films
Columbia Pictures films
English-language Netflix original films
Films about father–daughter relationships
Films about widowhood
Films based on memoirs
Films directed by Paul Weitz
Films scored by Rupert Gregson-Williams
Films postponed due to the COVID-19 pandemic
Films set in Boston
Films shot in Boston
Films shot in Montreal
Higher Ground Productions films
Temple Hill Entertainment films
2020s American films